Ryan Oosthuizen (born ) is a South African rugby union player, currently playing with the South Africa Sevens team in the World Rugby Sevens Series. His regular position is forward in 7s and centre in 15 man rugby. 

He made his debut for the South Africa Sevens team at the 2017 Hong Kong Sevens and was also a member of the South Africa Sevens team that won the 2016–17 World Rugby Sevens Series. He is also a bronze medal winner at the 2018 World Cup 7s in San Francisco.

References

South African rugby union players
Living people
1995 births
People from Stellenbosch
Rugby union centres
Western Province (rugby union) players
South Africa international rugby sevens players